The Sprague House is a historic house in Danvers, Massachusetts.  It is a -story wood-frame structure, five bays wide, with a side-gable roof, end chimneys, and clapboard siding.  This well preserved Federal style house was built in 1810 for Joseph Sprague, Jr., son of a wealthy Salem merchant who was also involved in the family business.  The house's main Federal feature is its central doorway, which features a semicircular fanlight window and a pedimented overhang supported by pilasters.

The house was listed on the National Register of Historic Places in 1987.

See also
National Register of Historic Places listings in Essex County, Massachusetts
List of the oldest buildings in Massachusetts

References

Houses in Danvers, Massachusetts
Houses on the National Register of Historic Places in Essex County, Massachusetts